Wayne Township is a township in Dauphin County, Pennsylvania, United States. The population was 1,264 at the 2020 census.

History
Wayne Township was named for Anthony Wayne.

The Shoop Site (36DA20) was listed on the National Register of Historic Places in 1986.

Geography

Demographics

As of the census of 2000, there were 1,184 people, 411 households, and 355 families living in the township.  The population density was 84.9 people per square mile (32.8/km).  There were 426 housing units at an average density of 30.5/sq mi (11.8/km).  The racial makeup of the township was 99.16% White, 0.08% Native American, 0.25% Asian, and 0.51% from two or more races. Hispanic or Latino of any race were 0.34% of the population.

There were 411 households, out of which 41.4% had children under the age of 18 living with them, 78.6% were married couples living together, 4.6% had a female householder with no husband present, and 13.4% were non-families. 10.9% of all households were made up of individuals, and 2.2% had someone living alone who was 65 years of age or older.  The average household size was 2.88 and the average family size was 3.08.

In the township the population was spread out, with 27.4% under the age of 18, 6.4% from 18 to 24, 33.4% from 25 to 44, 24.5% from 45 to 64, and 8.3% who were 65 years of age or older.  The median age was 36 years. For every 100 females, there were 109.6 males.  For every 100 females age 18 and over, there were 105.5 males.

The median income for a household in the township was $48,971, and the median income for a family was $50,917. Males had a median income of $39,375 versus $26,731 for females. The per capita income for the township was $19,279.  About 4.1% of families and 4.8% of the population were below the poverty line, including 3.0% of those under age 18 and 2.2% of those age 65 or over.

References

External links 
Map of Wayne Township, Dauphin County, Pennsylvania, Pennsylvania Department of Transportation

Harrisburg–Carlisle metropolitan statistical area
Townships in Dauphin County, Pennsylvania
Townships in Pennsylvania